The Vallot Hut (French: Refuge Vallot) is a refuge in the Mont Blanc massif on the upper slopes of Mont Blanc in the Alps. It is located below the Bosses Ridge between the Dome du Gouter and Mont Blanc summit, at an altitude of 4,362 metres. Intended only as an emergency shelter, and not as a base for ascending Mont Blanc, this unheated duralumin box was designed to accommodate up to 12 people, but often contains considerably more.

References

External links
 Le Refuge Vallot
Location of Vallot Hut on French IGN mapping portal

Mountain huts in the Alps
Mountain huts in France